Mieczysław Edmund Janowski (born 16 November 1947 in Zduńska Wola) is a Polish politician and Member of the European Parliament (MEP) for the Subcarpathian Voivodship with the Law and Justice, part of the Union for a Europe of Nations. He sits on the European Parliament's Committee on Regional Development.

Janowski is a substitute for the Committee on Industry, Research and Energy and the Committee on Petitions. Janowski is also a member of the Delegation for relations with Switzerland, Iceland and Norway and to the European Economic Area (EEA) Joint Parliamentary Committee.

Education
 1972: Master's in Engineering Warsaw University of Technology
 graduate of the Dept
 1972: of Pedagogy, Warsaw University of Technology
 1980: Doctor of Engineering, Rzeszów University of Technology

Career
 1972-1973: Design specialist at WSK PZL - Rzeszów
 1973-1982: Lecturer at the Rzeszów University of Technology
 since 1980: Member of the independent self-governing trade union NSZZ Solidarność
 1998-2003: Member of Solidarity Election Action - Social Movement (RS AWS)
 1990-1998: Councillor
 1991-1999: Mayor of Rzeszów
 2001-2004: Senator of the Republic of Poland, Chairman of the Committee for Territorial Autonomy and State Administration, member of the Committee on National Economy (1997-2001), Vice-Chairman Committee for Territorial Autonomy and State Administration, member of the Committee on Environmental Protection
 1994-1998: Delegate to the Local Chamber of the Congress of Local and Regional Authorities of the Council of Europe
 Member of the Association of Polish Engineers and Mechanical Technicians
 Member of the National League, Catholic Action, Polish Community

Decorations
 Bronze Cross of Merit

See also
 2004 European Parliament election in Poland

External links
 
 

1947 births
Living people
People from Zduńska Wola
Law and Justice politicians
People from Rzeszów
Members of the Senate of Poland 1997–2001
Members of the Senate of Poland 2001–2005
Law and Justice MEPs
MEPs for Poland 2004–2009